The Westmoreland Canals Act was an Act of the Parliament of Great Britain (32 Geo. III c. 101) passed in 1792. It authorised the construction of the Lancaster Canal between Kendal in Westmorland (now Cumbria) and Wigan in Lancashire (now Greater Manchester)

The opening paragraph reads:
"An Act for making and maintaining a Navigable Canal from Kirkby Kendal, in the County of Westmorland, [sic] to West Houghton, in the County Palatine of Lancaster; and also a Navigable Branch from the said intended Canal at or near Borwick, to or near Watron Cragg; and also another Navigable Branch from, at, or near Gale Moss, by Chorley, to or near Duxbury, in the said County Palatine of Lancaster".

See also
 Lancaster Canal Tramroad

Notes

References
Barritt, S. (2000) The Old Tramroad - Walton Summit to Preston Basin, Lancaster : Carnegie, 

Great Britain Acts of Parliament 1792